Ferral is a freguesia (civil parish) in the municipality of Montalegre, Vila Real District, Portugal.

Ferral may also refer to:
 Ferral C. Dininny (1818–1901), American businessman and politician in New York State

See also
 Ferrals-les-Corbières, a commune in the Aude department, southern France
 US Ferrals XIII, an amateur rugby league club based in Ferrals-les-Corbières
 Ferrals-les-Montagnes, a commune in the Hérault department, southern France
 Feral (disambiguation)
 Ferrol (disambiguation)